Serry is a surname, and may refer to:

 Robert Serry (born 1950), Dutch diplomat and UN Special Coordinator for the Middle East Peace Process
 Jacques-Hyacinthe Serry (1659-1738), French theologian
 John Serry, Sr. (1915-2003), Italian-American musician

See also

 Serry-Kamal